Chel Shah Heydar Aqa (also Romanized as Chel Shah Ḩeydar Āqā) is a village in Darreh Kayad Rural District, Sardasht District, Dezful County, Khuzestan Province, Iran. At the 2006 census, its population was 25, in 4 families.

References 

Populated places in Dezful County